Valde may refer to:

People

Given name
 Valde Garcia (born 1958), American politician
 Valde Hirvikanta (1863–1911), Finnish politician
 Valde Uukareda (1886–1936), Estonian politician

Surname
 Pierre Valde (1907–1977), French stage actor and theatre director

Places
 Valde-Ucieza, Spain